Nemacaulis is a monotypic plant genus in the buckwheat family containing the single species Nemacaulis denudata, which is known by the common names woollyheads and cottonheads. This plant is a somewhat nondescript delicate annual herb with thin, spindly, naked stems and woolly white flowerheads. It can be found in sandy habitats in California, Arizona, and northern Mexico.

References

External links 
 Jepson Manual Treatment
 USDA Plants Profile
 Flora of North America

Monotypic Polygonaceae genera
Flora of Arizona
Flora of California
Flora of Mexico
Flora without expected TNC conservation status